Barbara Ljiljak (born 1989) is a Croatian model and beauty pageant titleholder who was crowned Miss Universe Hrvatske 2015. She was supposed to represent Croatia at Miss Universe 2015 but withdrew due to an arm injury.

Personal life
Ljiljak is working as a Fashion Designer in Croatia.

Miss Universe Croatia 2015
On June 7, 2015, Ljiljak crowned Miss Universe Croatia 2015 in the Crystal Ballroom at Hotel Westin in Zagreb, Croatia represented Split. Twenty contestants from across Croatia competed for the crown. While Miss Zadar, Alma Fabulić and Miss Krapina-Zagorje, Mirta Laura Kustan crowned the runners-up of the event

References

External links
Official Miss Universe Hrvatske website

Croatian beauty pageant winners
Living people
1989 births